Bake Off Argentina: El Gran Pastelero is an Argentinian reality television broadcast by Telefe and produced by Turner International Argentina based on the British television baking competition The Great British Bake Off. In this Argentinian version, 14 amateur bakers compete against each other in a series of rounds, attempting to impress a group of judges with their baking skills to be named the best amateur baker in Argentina. Every week the amateur bakers face two challenges with a thematic.

It premiered on April 8, 2018, and it is hosted by Paula Chaves with judges Christophe Krywonis, Damián Betular and Pamella Villar. To date, the reality competition has three seasons (2018, 2020 & 2021).

Seasons summary

Host and judges

1st season (2018) 
The first season was premiered on April 8 and last aired on June 24 in 2018. The filming took place in Benavidez, Buenos Aires.

Contestants

Challenges

Episode 1: Premiere

Episode 2: Meringue

Episode 3: Patisserie

Episode 4: Cookies

Episode 5: Desserts

Episode 6: Fruits

Episode 7: Argentina 
Since this episode was 3 challenges. 2 creatives and 1 technical

Episode 8: Chocolate 

No enumeration in technical challenge

Episode 9: Semifinal

Episode 10: 3rd place definition

Episode 11: Final

2nd season (2020) 
The second season was premiered March 1 and last aired July 5 in 2020. The filming took place in Pilar, Buenos Aires.

Contestants

Technical and creative challenges

Episode 1: Premiere

Episode 2: American pastry

Episode 3: Argentinian pastry

Episode 4: Trending pastry

Episode 5: Italian pastry

Episode 6: English tea

In this episode there was no Starbaker because none of the concursants managed to pass two challenges

Episode 7: Flowers and fruits

Episode 8: Thinking different

Episode 9: Repechage
In this special episode, the 8 eliminated concursants enfrented in a repechage. Only 3 of them return to the tent

Carolina automatically returns to the tent by being chosen by the contestants like the best in the technical challenge
Leandro was automatically eliminated for having the worst performance in the technical challenge

Episode 10: Love
Since this episode there is no second starbaker

In this episode 7 of 9 concursants was in the last place in the technical challenge

Episode 11: Childhood

Episode 12: Français pastry

Episode 13: Vanguardist
Since this episode there are going to be three challenges. 2 creative and 1 technical

Episode 14: Chocolate

In this episode, the concursants started cooking with 10 minutes of difference in the technical challenge because the chocolate volcano eats hot

Episode 15: First semifinal

In this episode no one was eliminated
No enumeration in technical challenge
Gaston Salas, first season winner, was the 4th judge in the 2nd creative challenge

Episode 16: Second semifinal
In this episode the judge was the encharged of the challenges

Episode 17: Third place definition

Episode 18: Final

Samanta was the winner but in 2020 July she was dethroned because, supposedly, she was a professional baker.

3rd season (2021) 
The third season was premiered September 13. The filming took place in Pilar, Buenos Aires.

Contestants

References 

Cooking competitions
Argentine cuisine